Kothamangalam is a panchayat town in the Sivaganga district, in the state of Tamil Nadu, India. Kothamangalam Pin code is 630105 and postal head office is Kothamangalam (Sivaganga).

Geography
The latitude 10.187397 and longitude 78.8071150000001 are the geocoordinate of the Kothamangalam. The capital city of Tamil Nadu, Chennai is located around 416 kilometer away from Kothamangalam. The other nearest state capital from Kothamangalam is Pondicherry and its distance is 224.6 km. The other surrounding state capitals are Thiruvananthapuram (268.2 km. distance), Bangalore (338.3 km. distance).

Kothamangalam is a village in Sakkottai Block in Sivaganga District of Tamil Nadu State, India. It is located 60 km to the north of District headquarters Sivaganga. 13 km from Sakkottai. 416 km from State capital Chennai.
Kothamangalam village is located in the UTC 5.30 time zone and it follows Indian standard time (IST). Kothamangalam sun rise time varies 16 minutes from IST.

Demographics

Population 
Kothamangalam Village Total population is 3551 and number of houses are 903. Female Population is 50.0%. Village literacy rate is 69.6% and the Female Literacy rate is 31.4%.

Languages 

Kothamangalam Local Language is Tamil.

Government and politics

Economy

Transport

By Air  
Kothamangalam's nearest airport is Tiruchirapalli International Airport situated at 64.7 km distance. Few more airports around Kothamangalam are as follows.

By Rail  
The nearest railway station to Kothamangalam is Chettinad which is located in and around 4.5 kilometer distance. The following table shows other railway stations and its distance from Mamakudi.

By Road

Education 
Kothamangalam nearest schools has been listed as follows.

Landmark 

 S.M.RM House 
 Rao Bahadur House
 Nehru Club
 Shanmuga Vilas
 Saradha Vilas 
 Sengathar House
 Annamalai Illam
 Sakthi Sai Baba Temple

Map of Kothamangalam 
 Google Maps Kothamangalam, Sivangangai - 630105

Adjacent communities
Vadagudi (7 km), Palavangudi (12 km), Sakkottai (13 km), Koviloor (16 km), Mathur (16 km) are the nearby villages to Kothamangalam. Kothamangalam is surrounded by Sakkottai Block to the south, Tirumayam Block to the north, Tiruppathur Block to the west, Thiruvarankulam Block to the north.

Karaikudi, Pudukkottai, Peravurani, Sivaganga are the nearby cities to Kothamangalam.	

This place is in the border of the Sivaganga District and Pudukkottai District. Pudukkottai District Arantangi is east of this place.

The surrounding nearby villages and its distance from Kothamangalam are Chettinadu 4.0 km, Ambakkudi 17.2 km, Nattuseri 21.1 km, Sakkottai, Chockalingapuram, Sangarapuram, Jeyankondan, Nemam.
Kothamangalam's nearest town/city/important place is Kanadukathan located at the distance of 3.5 kilometer. Surrounding town/city/TP/CT from Kothamangalam are as follows.

Nearest districts to Kothamangalam 
Kothamangalam is located around 50.3 kilometer away from its district headquarter sivaganga. The other nearest district headquarters is pudukkottai situated at 21.2 km distance from Kothamangalam. Surrounding districts from Kothamangalam are as follows.

Reference 

Cities and towns in Sivaganga district